Sedlčany is a town in Příbram District in the Central Bohemian Region of the Czech Republic. It has about 6,800 inhabitants.

Administrative parts
Villages of Doubravice, Hradišťko, Libíň, Oříkov, Sestrouň, Solopysky, Třebnice, Vítěž and Zberaz are administrative parts of Sedlčany.

Geography
It lies in the Benešov Uplands. The town is situated on the Mastník river, a tributary of the Vltava. On the river there is the Sedlčany Retention Reservoir.

History

The first written mention of Sedlčany is from 1294, when Sedlčany already held market rights. Then held by the Vítkovci Neuhaus (Hradec) family, the estates were given in pawn to the House of Rosenberg by King John of Bohemia in 1337. The citizens joined the Hussite movement as vassals of Oldřich II of Rosenberg and during the Hussite Wars the town temporarily was controlled by radical Taborites. Thanks to Oldřich II of Rosenberg, Sedlčany gained town privileges in 1418.

In 1475 the noble House of Lobkowicz took over Sedlčany in exchange for Rožmberk Castle, given in pawn by the Bohemian chamberlain John II of Rosenberg in 1464. The Rosenbergs regained the town, however, in 1580 William of Rosenberg relinquished it to his custodian Jakub Krčín. Upon his death in 1604 the last Rosenberg scion Peter Vok sold Sedlčany to the Bohemian chancellor Zdeněk Vojtěch Popel of Lobkowicz, who administered stern Counter-Reformation measures to its citizens. The town was devastated by Swedish troops during the Thirty Years' War and did not recover until the mid 18th century.

From 1804 Sedlčany/Selčan was part of the Austrian Empire and after the Compromise of 1867 belonged to the Cisleithanian half of Austria-Hungary. The town was the administrative seat of a district of the same name, one of the 94 Bezirkshauptmannschaften in the crown land of Bohemia. Sedlčany developed to a centre of textile industry, the local economy was further promoted when the town received access to the railway line to Olbramovice in 1894. Under the Protectorate of Bohemia and Moravia the nearby SS-Truppenübungsplatz Böhmen was laid out from 1941, whereby numerous villages were cleared and the inhabitants expelled.

Demographics

Economy
For many decades, Sedlčany was famous for its production of Hermelín cheese. However, the production was moved by the dairy's owner from Sedlčany to Přibyslav in 2019.

Sights
The landmark of Sedlčany and its oldest building is the Church of Saint Martin. The original Romanesque church, which was as old as the town, was completely rebuilt in the Gothic style in 1374. A tower with Romanesque-Gothic windows has been preserved from the original church. The building was originally fortified. A free-standing Renaissance belfry belongs to the church. The interior decoration includes an extensive fresco of the Adoration of the Three Kings

Notable people

Joseph Radetzky von Radetz (1766–1858), field marshal
Karel Baxa (1863–1938), mayor of Prague
Jindřiška Flajšhansová (1868–1931), writer and women's rights activist

Twin towns – sister cities

Sedlčany is twinned with:
 Taverny, France
 Wągrowiec County, Poland

References

External links

Cities and towns in the Czech Republic
Populated places in Příbram District